John R. Hargrove is a practicing lawyer in Boca Raton, Florida. He handles complex civil litigation, including First Amendment issues, probate and trust matters, elder law and appeals.

In 2001 Hargrove was elected to the board of trustees of Butler University in Indianapolis, Indiana, served as board chair from 2008 to 2011, a period which included Butler's appearance in two NCAA basketball national championship games.  In 2014 he was named Butler's first Board of Trustees Chair Emeritus.  In 2016 Hargrove was awarded The Butler Medal which is the highest honor conferred by the university's Alumni Association. It recognizes individuals for a lifetime of distinguished service to the university and their local community while at the same time achieving a distinguished career in their chosen profession and attaining a national reputation. All recipients have had a profound influence on the future course of Butler University.

Hargrove was born on January 20, 1947, in Chicago, Illinois.  He graduated from Butler University in 1969, and Indiana University School of Law, where he graduated magna cum laude in 1972.  Hargrove was a senior editor of the Indiana Law Review and at graduation was named by the law school faculty as the most outstanding student in his graduating class.  Following graduation, he served a two-year federal judicial clerkship for Roy L. Stephenson, United States Court of Appeals Judge for the Eighth Circuit. He also holds a master's degree in public administration from Harvard University, where he guest lectures in negotiations each semester.  He also routinely lectures on law office management at the graduate school of professional studies of George Washington University. Hargrove has also lectured on contextual leadership at The United States Military Academy located at West Point, New York.

Hargrove has been involved in a number of noteworthy cases, including First Amendment matters representing print and broadcast media, has litigated probate and trust matters both for institutional clients and high-net-worth individuals, and has championed the rights of senior citizens having served as lead counsel for plaintiffs in national class actions.  He is also noted as being one of the lawyers who represented the Estate of Doctor Sam Sheppard in the late 1990s when attorney Terry Gilbert of Cleveland, Ohio, pursued litigation on behalf of the Sheppard family in the Ohio courts.  The suit filed by Gilbert was an effort to clear Dr. Sheppard's name through the use of DNA evidence.  The Sheppard murder, which took place on July 4, 1954, is commonly viewed as the inspiration for "The Fugitive" television series and 1993 movie. Hargrove was a classmate of Dr. Sheppard's son, Sam Reese Sheppard, at Culver Military Academy in Indiana.

Hargrove has been married since 1972 to Mary Cheryl (Fuller) Hargrove

References
 Butler University Board of Trustees 
 Florida Super Lawyers 
 United Way of Broward County

External links
Hargrove Pierson & Brown Official Site

1947 births
Living people
Florida lawyers
American law firm executives
Culver Academies alumni
Butler University alumni
Indiana University alumni
Harvard Kennedy School alumni